Longping High-Tech Park is a High tech industrial park at state level in Furong District of Changsha City, Hunan Province, China, one of four industrial parks of Changsha High-Tech Industrial Development Zone. The industrial park is the original Mapoling Agricultural High-Tech Park, which was one of two high-tech agricultural parks approved by the former State Science and Technology Commission in 1997, it was Changed to Longping Agricultural High-Tech Park in October, 2000 and to the present name in November 2003. It is named after the agronomist and hybrid rice expert Yuan Longping.

In 2015, the total industrial output value of the park is CNY 40.5 billion (US$6.5 billion), the total service and business income of enterprises is CNY 55 billion (US$8.83 billion). as of November 2016, there are 728 enterprises, 493 of that are service-oriented enterprises.

References 

Furong District
Economy of Changsha
1999 establishments in China